Raymond James 'Ray' Birks (1930-2008) was an Australian rugby league footballer who played in the 1950s.

Originally from the Sutherland Junior Rugby League Club  Birks was a tough Second Row forward at the St. George club that played predominately in Reserve Grade throughout his career (1952-58) although he featured in 6 first grade games between 1953-1955. 

Birks died on 19 April 2008, age 78.

Reference

1930 births
2008 deaths
St. George Dragons players
Australian rugby league players
Rugby league players from Sydney
Rugby league second-rows